Pūrva paksha, (Sanskrit: पूर्वपक्ष) sometimes also transliterated as Poorva paksha, literally means former view/position. It is a tradition in the debates of Indian Logicians. It involves building a deep familiarity with the opponent's point of view before criticising it. The purva paksha approach has been used by Adi Shankaracharya as well as Ramanuja and later acharyas in their works. 

In ancient Indian jurisprudence, purva paksha referred to the complaint, with other parts of a trial consisting of uttar (the later), kriyaa (trial or investigation by the court), and nirnaya (verdict or decision).

In his book Being Different (2011), Rajiv Malhotra sought to use the purva paksha approach. Malhotra states that purva paksha

According to Shrinivas Tilak, Malhotra's use of purva paksha in Being Different may be regarded as a kind of "reverse anthropology." Tilak states that

See also
Tarka sastra

References

Hindu philosophical concepts